The Premio Nacional Eugenio Espejo ("Eugenio Espejo National Award") is the national prize of the nation of Ecuador. Decrees 677 and 699 (of August 1975 and September 1997, respectively) established the prize, which is conferred by the President of Ecuador. The Award is bestowed every other year. Finalists for receiving the award are put on a short list by the National Council of Culture, and grouped into five categories:

Cultural Promotion
Arts
Literature
Science
Public or Private Institutions.

The recipients are then selected from that list by the head of state, who awards them a sum of money, a diploma, a medal and lifetime stipend.

Recipients
From 1975 to 2018 there have been 98 recipients of the prize. Not all categories have been awarded every year resulting in a different number of recipients for each category. 26 for cultural promotion, 19 for arts, 24 for literature, 23 for science, 9 for public or private institutions.

References

Ecuadorian awards
Ecuadorian literary awards